Mariano Sabino Lopes (born 12 April 1975), also known by his nom de guerre , is an East Timorese politician and a member of the Democratic Party (PD). Between 2001 and 2007, he was a member of the National Parliament of East Timor. Between August 2007 and February 2015, he was Minister of Agriculture and Fisheries, and from October 2017 to June 2018 he was Minister of State and Minister for Mineral Resources. In June 2018, he resumed his membership of the National Parliament.

Early life and career
Sabino attended primary school in Pairara in the then district of Lautém. In 1991, he began studying at the University of Brawijaya in Malang, East Java, Indonesia. There, he joined the National Resistance of East Timorese Students ( (RENETIL)). Amongst other things, he formulated plans to infiltrate the Ikatan Mahasiswa dan Pelajar Timor Timur (IMPETTU), the Indonesian-East Timorese student association. He was also involved in the 1995 embassy occupations in Jakarta and demonstrations in 1998.

In April 1999, a few months before the independence referendum, Sabino organised for 850 students from Indonesian universities to return to East Timor to campaign for independence. At that time, he was Deputy Secretary General of RENETIL and head of Ikatan Mahasiswa dan Pelajar Timor Timur (IMPETTU), the East Timorese student association.

Political career
In 2001, Sabino was elected as a PD candidate to the Constituent Assembly of East Timor, from which the National Parliament emerged in 2002. On 31 August 2007, he had to give up his seat in accordance with the Constitution, when he was sworn in as Minister of Agriculture, Forestry and Fisheries in the IV Constitutional Government headed by Prime Minister Xanana Gusmão.

According to an alleged confidential diplomatic cable by the then United States Charge d'Affaires in Dili that was allegedly later leaked to WikiLeaks:

However, Sabino remained in his Ministerial office throughout the IV and V Constitutional Governments until 16 February 2015, when the latter government was replaced by the VI Constitutional Government led by Prime Minister Rui Maria de Araújo.

In October 2015, the East Timorese Chamber of Auditors accused Sabino of "possible financial breaches", which were said to have resulted in possible losses of more than USD 11 million between 2011 and 2014. In some cases, according to an audit to the Ministry of Agriculture and Fisheries, contracts for the supply of goods and services were made with companies close to Sabino, without complying with the required procedures.

In 2017, Sabino was re-elected to the National Parliament, as the list leader in the PD list. However, on 3 October 2017 he was sworn in as Minister for the Council of Ministers in the VII Constitutional Government led by Prime Minister Mari Alkatiri, and therefore again had to give up his seat in accordance with the Constitution. As that Fretilin / PD minority administration could not prevail in the National Parliament, President Francisco Guterres dissolved the Parliament and called a fresh parliamentary election. In the election, held on 12 May 2018, Sabino was again number 1 on the PD list, and was again elected to Parliament, in which the PD initially became part of the opposition. Sabino's tenure as a Minister ended when the VIII Constitutional Government took office on 22 June 2018.

, Sabino was a member of the Parliamentary Committee for Economy and Development (Committee D).

Personal life
Mariano's father, Mateus Sabino, was Liurai of Luro, Lautém, and his mother was Julieta Ribeiro.

References

External links 

Democratic Party (East Timor) politicians
Government ministers of East Timor
Living people
Members of the National Parliament (East Timor)
People from Lautém District
University of Brawijaya alumni
1975 births
21st-century East Timorese politicians